The ovarian vein, the female gonadal vein, carries deoxygenated blood from its corresponding ovary to inferior vena cava or one of its tributaries.  It is the female equivalent of the testicular vein, and is the venous counterpart of the ovarian artery.  It can be found in the suspensory ligament of the ovary.

Structure
It is a paired vein, each one supplying an ovary.  
 The right ovarian vein travels through the suspensatory ligament of the ovary and generally joins the inferior vena cava.
 The left ovarian vein, unlike the right, often joins the left renal vein instead of the inferior vena cava.

Pathology
Thrombosis of ovarian vein is associated with postpartum endometritis, pelvic inflammatory disease, diverticulitis, appendicitis, and gynecologic surgery.

Additional images

See also
Ovarian vein syndrome

References

External links
  - "Posterior Abdominal Wall: Tributaries to the Inferior Vena Cava"

Veins of the torso